Mirina confucius is a moth of the family Endromidae. It is found in mountain forests in northern Vietnam, northern Thailand and south-western China.

References 

Moths described in 2000
Endromidae
Confucius